Richard Rau (26 August 1889 – 6 November 1945) was a German SS officer  and track and field athlete who competed in the 1912 Summer Olympics. He was eliminated in the semi-finals of the 100 m and finished fourth in the 200 m competition. He was also a member of the German relay team which was disqualified in the final of the 4 × 100 m relay after a fault with its second baton passing.

Rau started competing in flat sprint and hurdles in 1908, winning several national championships and setting 20 national records over his career, often under pseudonym Richard Einsporn. After retirement he ran a sports shop, and in 1933 joined the Nazi Party, reaching the rank of SS Hauptsturmbannführer in 1938. In 1945 he was captured by the American forces and handed over to the Soviet Union. He was shot during a failed escape attempt, and moved to a prisoners camp in Vyasma, where he died in a few months.

References

1889 births
1945 deaths
Athletes from Berlin
German male sprinters
Olympic athletes of Germany
Athletes (track and field) at the 1912 Summer Olympics
World record setters in athletics (track and field)
SS officers
Nazi Party members
German prisoners of war in World War II held by the United States
German prisoners of war in World War II held by the Soviet Union